The 2020–21 Marshall Thundering Herd men's basketball team represented Marshall University during the 2020–21 NCAA Division I men's basketball season. The Thundering Herd, led by seventh-year head coach Dan D'Antoni, played their home games at the Cam Henderson Center as members of the East Division of Conference USA. They finished the season 15–7, 9–5 in C-USA play to finish in third place in the East Division. They were defeated in the second round of the C-USA tournament by Rice.

Previous season
The Thundering Herd finished the 2019–20 season 17–15, 10–8 in C-USA play to finish in sixth place. They defeated UTEP in the opening round of the C-USA tournament, and they were scheduled to play Louisiana Tech in the quarterfinals. However, the remainder of the tournament was canceled due to the coronavirus pandemic.

Offseason

Departures

2020 recruiting class

Roster

Schedule and results

|-
!colspan=12 style=| Non-Conference Regular season

|-
!colspan=9 style=| Conference USA regular season

|-
!colspan=9 style=| Conference USA tournament

Notes

References

Marshall Thundering Herd men's basketball seasons
Marshall
Marsh
Marsh